Darren William Veitch (born April 24, 1960) is a Canadian former professional ice hockey player whose career was beset by injuries. He played 511 career NHL games for the Washington Capitals, Detroit Red Wings and Toronto Maple Leafs, and was once named The Hockey News's "Comeback Player of the Year" after badly injuring his arm falling through a glass coffee table after slipping at home on one of his children's toys. He was often unfairly compared to Paul Coffey, a fellow defenceman selected immediately after him in the 1980 NHL Entry Draft. He played his last NHL game in 1991 and bounced around the minor leagues before finally retiring in 1999, and now enjoys recreational roller hockey at the Castle Sports Club in Phoenix, AZ.

Born  in Saskatoon, Saskatchewan, Veitch won an Ed Chynoweth Cup with the Regina Pats in 1980 to cap off a stellar junior career. 

Darren also had a distinguished amateur golf career in addition to his hockey exploits.  He was the 1983 Saskatchewan Amateur champion after a three-round score of 218 at the Elmwood Golf and Country Club in Swift Current.  He was also a two-time runner-up in the tournament finishing second in both 1981 and 1984.

Career statistics

Awards
 WHL First All-Star Team – 1980

References

External links

Profile at hockeydraftcentral.com

1960 births
Living people
Canadian expatriate ice hockey players in the United States
Canadian ice hockey defencemen
Detroit Red Wings players
Ice hockey people from Saskatchewan
National Hockey League first-round draft picks
Phoenix Roadrunners (IHL) players
Regina Pats players
Sportspeople from Saskatoon
Toronto Maple Leafs players
Washington Capitals draft picks
Washington Capitals players